Soane Havea, full name, Soane Patita Pat Boone Sioape Havea (born 29 August 1981) is a Tongan rugby union player who currently plays for the Tautahi Gold in the IRB Pacific Rugby Cup. His favourite position is scrum-half.

He also plays for the Marist Ma'ufanga Rugby Club in the Datec Cup Provincial Championship

He made his international test debut for Tonga against New Zealand on June 16, 2000. He was present at the 2007 Rugby World Cup.

Notes

1981 births
Living people
Tongan rugby union players
Rugby union scrum-halves
Tonga international rugby union players
Place of birth missing (living people)